Orzechowo  is a settlement in the administrative district of Gmina Ustka, within Słupsk County, Pomeranian Voivodeship, in northern Poland. It is located at the mouth of the Orzechowa River on the Slovincian Coast.

References

Orzechowo
Populated coastal places in Poland
Seaside resorts in Poland